"Hold Me, Baby" is a song written by Amos Milburn and Lola Anne Cullum. Milburn performed the song (vocals and piano) on a record released on the Aladdin label (catalog no. 3023-B). The record debuted on  Billboard magazine's R&B chats on April 23, 1949, peaked at No. 2 on the juke box and best seller charts, and remained on the charts for 15 weeks. It was ranked No. 8 on the magazine's year-end list of the best-selling R&B records of 1949 (No. 13 based on juke box plays).

See also
 Billboard Top R&B Records of 1949

References

1949 songs
Rhythm and blues songs